Guy and Pauline is a 1915 novel by the British writer Compton Mackenzie. It was begun on Capri and written in three and a half months, and remained Mackenzie's favourite of his own works. It was published in America with the alternative title of Plashers Mead.

Reception

References

Bibliography
 Orel, Harold. Popular Fiction in England, 1914-1918. University Press of Kentucky, 1992.

1915 British novels
Novels by Compton Mackenzie